Pigritia dido is a moth in the family Blastobasidae. It is found in Costa Rica.

The length of the forewings is 4–5.5 mm. The forewings have greyish brown scales tipped with white intermixed with greyish-brown and white scales. The hindwings are translucent pale brown, gradually darkening towards the apex.

Etymology
The specific name refers to Dido, founder of Carthage, daughter of Belus of Tyre, and sister of Pygmalion.

References

Moths described in 2013
Blastobasidae